Olha Vashchuk (born ; 13 August 1987) is a Ukrainian (until 2014) and Turkish (since 2014) handballer playing for the Turkish club Ardeşen GSK. She played for Ukrainian national team (until 2014).

Formerly, she was with the Macedonian team ŽRK Metalurg.

References

External links

1987 births
Sportspeople from Zaporizhzhia
Living people
Ukrainian female handball players
Ukrainian expatriate sportspeople in Romania
Ukrainian expatriate sportspeople in Hungary
Ukrainian expatriate sportspeople in Russia
Ukrainian expatriate sportspeople in North Macedonia
SCM Râmnicu Vâlcea (handball) players
Fehérvár KC players
Turkish female handball players
Ukrainian emigrants to Turkey
Ardeşen GSK players
Expatriate handball players in Turkey